, also known as Maximum the Ryo (マキシマムザ亮君 Makishimamu Za Ryō-kun), is the guitarist, songwriter and singer of Japanese metal band Maximum the Hormone.

General information
Ryo had played guitar since his years in junior high school. He was recruited into the band Maximum the Hormone by his sister Nao Kawakita after the departure of Key. His guitar playing is heavy and influenced by metal, punk, and hard rock bands including Tool, System of a Down, NOFX, The Ramones, Korn, Mr. Bungle, Pantera, Oasis, The Fall of Troy, Molotov, Cheap Trick.

Ryo made a guest appearance with Wagdug Futuristic Unity on "Systematic People", a track from Wagdug's Hakai album. "Systematic People" was also used as the opening theme for the anime series Kurozuka.

References

1978 births
Living people
Musicians from Hachiōji, Tokyo
Musicians from Kanagawa Prefecture
Japanese heavy metal guitarists
Japanese heavy metal singers
Nu metal singers
21st-century Japanese singers
20th-century Japanese guitarists
21st-century Japanese guitarists